The Wolani or Wodani are a people in the Indonesian Paniai regency (kabupaten) of the Central Papua Province in Western New Guinea. Numbering about 5000 in 1992, they are farmers who live in the central highlands northeast of Lake Paniai, along the Kemandoga and Mbiyandogo rivers. Many Wolani converted to Christianity but, like elsewhere in Indonesia, they retain their traditional religion. They speak Wolani, which is affiliated with the western branch of the Trans–New Guinea languages, similar to the nearby Ekari and Moni languages.

It is not clear if the Wolani are a subgroup of the Lani. There is some imprecision in the classification of cultures in this region, with the Lani often being identified with a larger group, the Dani.

Representations in Media 
 The Wolani Shells is a 2005 film by British filmmaker Alastair Kenneil. In 2005, National Geographic aired the film as Tribal Odyssey: the Wolani Shells (Season 1, Episode 2 of its Tribal Odyssey series).
 A Wolani song, Troisième soirée, Les Wolani à Ebugangwe - Yohi-Yaya-O, calme, appears in a collection of regional music, Les Dani de Nouvelle Guinée Volume 1.

See also

Indigenous people of New Guinea
Stéphane Breton (filmmaker)

References

Ethnic groups in Indonesia
Indigenous ethnic groups in Western New Guinea